Loch Morar (Scottish Gaelic: Loch Mòrair) is a freshwater loch in Lochaber, Highland, Scotland. It separates the traditional district of North Morar (which contains the village of Morar), from Arisaig and Moidart.

Geography

The water of the loch is clear and oligotrophic, with a minimal intake of nutrients, making it a Site of Special Scientific Interest (SSSI). The main inflow is the River Meoble on the southern side, which drains from Loch Beoraid, although there are three other major inflows at the eastern end of the loch and a stream draining a complex of lochans to the north-west of Loch Morar. The outflow is the River Morar at the western end, which at a few hundred metres long is one of the shortest rivers in the British Isles. At the shallower western end of the loch, there are a number of sizeable forested islands.

Swordland Lodge, on the northern shore of the loch, was used as training school STS 23b during the Second World War by the Special Operations Executive.

Habitation
At the western end of the loch is the village of Morar, which is between Arisaig and Mallaig on the coastal A830 road. The settlements of Bracorina and Bracara are located along the northern shore of the loch, but there is no road along the southern shore. Tarbet, on the shore of Loch Nevis, is a short distance from Loch Morar.

During the period of the Highland Clearances, many residents emigrated to Canada. Boats left in 1790, 1802, and 1826, carrying people to Quebec, Glengarry in Ontario, and the Strait of Canso in Nova Scotia respectively.

Geology

Loch Morar is located entirely within the Morar Group of sediments, which were deposited in the latter part of the Cambrian, and subsequently subjected to many phases of deformation.

The loch occupies a basin produced by the overdeepening of the valley by glacial erosion, along an east-west fault line. It is not a sea loch due to isostatic rebound that raised the rock sill at the end of the loch.

An outwash fan made up of sand and gravels at the western end of the loch marks the limit of the re-advance in the Morar valley. Subsequently, colonised by vegetation and known as Mointeach Mhòr (the mossy plain), these deposits blocked the outflow of the loch to the south, so that it drained from the north-west corner instead.

A site to the north of the loch was selected in 2011 as a SSSI for its characteristic rock exposures of the Moine group by the Geological Conservation Review, replacing the area around Mallaig harbour, which had been previously regarded as the most representative site.

Wildlife
The loch is surrounded by a mix of natural woodland, open hillside, sheep and cattle pasture and planted mixed coniferous and broadleaf woodlands. Only around 0.7% of the surface of the loch can be colonised by plants.

Fish
Loch Morar's fish population is believed to be limited to Atlantic Salmon, brown trout and sea trout, Arctic char, eel, stickleback, and minnow. The loch is also known to contain eels, although none were caught in a recent survey of eel populations in Lochaber, suggesting that they prefer the loch to the tributaries surveyed. Catches of salmon and sea trout declined dramatically between the 1970s and 1980s, in common with other catchments on the west coast. Artificial stocking of the River Morar with salmon and sea trout was suspended in 2007 after the hatchery was closed.

The main salmonid spawning grounds are the River Meoble and the smaller burns that feed into the loch. The hydroelectric power station, which contain one of only two fish counters in Lochaber, is shut down during the smolt run, following a study on smolt mortality in 1992.

The catchment is managed by the  Morar District Salmon Fishery Sub-board, which employs a full-time fisheries manager. Poaching in the form of netting has been known to occur at the mouth of the River Morar.

Monster

In common with Loch Ness, occasional reports of large unidentified creatures in the loch's waters are made. The monster has been dubbed Morag.

References

External links

Map of Loch Morar from soundings performed by John Murray and Laurence Pullar
Murrary and Puller's description of the loch

Lochs of Highland (council area)
Lochaber
Loch Morar
Freshwater lochs of Scotland